This is the list of straits located in Estonia. The list is incomplete.

See also
List of straits

 
Straits